Dachengqiao is a rural town in Ningxiang City, Hunan Province, China.

Administrative division
The town is divided into five villages and three communities:
 Dachengqiao Community
 Chenggongtang Community
 Qingquan Community
 Yuxin
 Erquan
 Meiming
 Queshan 
 Yongsheng

Geography
Wei River is known as "Mother River", a tributary of the Xiang River, it flows through the town.

Economy
Watermelon is important to the economy.

Culture
Huaguxi is the most influence local theater.

Transport
The Provincial Highway S209 passes across the town.

The Provincial Highway S206 runs north to Huishangang, intersecting with S71 Yiyang-Loudi-Hengyang Expressway.

The County Road X091 runs east to west through the town.

References

Divisions of Ningxiang
Ningxiang